813 Baumeia (prov. designation:  or ) is a stony background asteroid from the inner regions of the asteroid belt. It was discovered on 28 November 1915, by German astronomer Max Wolf at the Heidelberg Observatory in southwest Germany. It was named for H. Baum, a German student of astronomy at Heidelberg who was killed in World War I.

Orbit and classification 

Baumeia is a non-family asteroid of the main belt's background population when applying the hierarchical clustering method to its proper orbital elements. It orbits the Sun in the inner main-belt at a distance of 2.2–2.3 AU once every 3 years and 4 months (1,211 days; semi-major axis of 2.22 AU). Its orbit has an eccentricity of 0.03 and an inclination of 6° with respect to the ecliptic.

Naming 

This minor planet was named im memory of H. Baum, a German astronomy student at Heidelberg University who was in World War I. The naming was published in the journal Astronomische Nachrichten in 1921 (AN 214, 69). The  was also mentioned in The Names of the Minor Planets by Paul Herget in 1955.

Physical characteristics 

Baumeia is a common, stony S-type asteroid in both the SMASS-I taxonomy by Xu (1995), as well as in the taxonomic classification based on MOVIS near-infrared colors from the catalog of the VISTA Hemisphere Survey conducted with the VISTA telescope at Paranal Observatory in Chile.

Rotation period 

In January 2019, a rotational lightcurve of Baumeia was obtained from photometric observations by European astronomers Bruno Christmann, Raoul Behrend, Anaël Wünsche, Marc Bretton, Rui Goncalves, Josep Bosch. Lightcurve analysis gave a well-defined rotation period of  hours with a brightness variation of  magnitude. 

The result confirms and refines previous observations by French amateur astronomer René Roy in February 2003, which gave a period of  hours with an amplitude of  magnitude, by Jean-Gabriel Bosch at the French Collonges Observatory  in February 2006, which gave an identical period of  hours with an amplitude of  magnitude, by James W. Brinsfield at the Via Capote Observatory  in Australia in November 2008, which gave the first secured period of  hours with an amplitude of  magnitude.

Diameter and albedo 

The Collaborative Asteroid Lightcurve Link derives an albedo of 0.2396 and a diameter of 13.61 kilometers based on an absolute magnitude of 11.5.

References

External links 
 Lightcurve Database Query (LCDB), at www.minorplanet.info
 Dictionary of Minor Planet Names, Google books
 Asteroids and comets rotation curves, CdR – Geneva Observatory, Raoul Behrend
 Discovery Circumstances: Numbered Minor Planets (1)-(5000) – Minor Planet Center
 
 

000813
Discoveries by Max Wolf
Named minor planets
19151128